Middle Bass-East Point Airport  is a private airport located on Middle Bass Island, Ohio, United States. It is owned and operated by East Point Associates, Inc.

Facilities and aircraft 
For the 12-month period ending July 11, 2013, the airport had 1,300 aircraft operations, of which 1,200 of them were general aviation and 100 were air taxi.

References

External links 

Transportation in Ottawa County, Ohio
Airports in Ohio